Crnjelovo may refer to:

 Crnjelovo Donje, a village in the City of Bijeljina
 Crnjelovo Gornje, a village in the City of Bijeljina